Guru is a 2022 three-part drama television series developed and produced by Dramedy Productions. The authors of the project Jan Coufal, Filip Bobiňski and Petr Šizling entrusted Jan Coufal's script to director Biser Arichtev. The series was filmed under the Voyo Original brand and published on the Voyo platform. After the series The Roubal Case, it is the second series filmed under the banner Voyo Original.

The series was inspired by real events, especially the character of Jaroslav Dobeš (known as Guru Jara), who practiced the so-called "unhooking" method and raped his female clients. Anna Fialová, Vojtěch Kotek, Zuzana Stivínová, Kristýna Podzimková, Lukáš Melník and Martin Myšička appeared in main roles.

The first episode was published on Voyo on 14 January 2022. The last part was released on 28 January 2022.

Cast 
 Anna Fialová as Alice Balvínová
 Vojtěch Kotek as guru Marek Jaroš
 Zuzana Stivínová as major Mgr. Petra Malá, vyšetřovatelka
 Kristýna Podzimková as Klára Plíšková, Markova spolupracovnice
 Lukáš Melník as Radek, bývalý partner Alice
 Martin Myšička as státní zástupce Pavel Vágner
 Alžběta Malá as Kamila, studentka
 Lucie Štěpánková as Magda, Kamilina matka
 Vasil Fridrich as Milan, Kamilin otec
 Denisa Barešová as Aneta, Alicina spolubydlící
 Martina Czyžová as Alicina spolubydlící
 Jiří Roskot as Karel
 Adéla Petřeková as vyšetřovatelka
 Marek Pospíchal as vyšetřovatel
 Michal Isteník as nadpraporčík Mgr. Doležal
 Kryštof Bartoš as Dušan
 Elizaveta Maximová as Zuzana
 Jan Novotný as soudce
 Petr Meissel as Jiří

Episodes

References

External links 
Official site
IMDB site

Czech crime television series
Czech drama television series
2022 Czech television series debuts
TV Nova (Czech TV channel) original programming
Czech television miniseries
Rape in television